Harry Brown  (10 May 1898 – 17 August 1917), was a Canadian First World War recipient of the Victoria Cross, the highest and most prestigious award for gallantry in the face of the enemy that can be awarded to British and Commonwealth forces.

Background
Harry Brown, from Gananoque, Ontario, was born on 9 May 1898 to John and Adelaide (née Leger).  After his father died, Harry lived with his mother and sisters, Irene and Loretta, in Peterborough.  His mother married Patrick McAuliffe of R. R. 1, East Emily in 1911 and Harry worked on the farm . Later, he moved to London, Ontario, where his sister, Irene, lived.  A story about Hill 70 in the Royal Canadian magazine <pg 8/18 March 2005> says he was working a munitions factory when he enlisted with the Canadian Mounted Rifles on 18 August 1916 at London, Ontario, where, according to his attestation paper, he was residing at the time. After being sent overseas, he was transferred to the 10th Battalion, CEF.

Brown was awarded the Victoria Cross for his actions on 16 August 1917, during the Battle of Hill 70 against the Germans, when Brown and another soldier ran the gauntlet with an "important message". Brown sustained mortal injury, and died the following day, 17 August.  His death is commemorated on the Gananoque Cenotaph and on 16 August 2007 a black marble memorial cairn was dedicated to commemorate the action for which he received the Victoria Cross

Citation

Harry Brown's Victoria Cross is displayed at the Canadian War Museum in Ottawa, Canada. The 10th Battalion, CEF is perpetuated by the Royal Winnipeg Rifles and the Calgary Highlanders of the Canadian Army Reserve.

He is also commemorated on the Omemee, Ontario Cenotaph, as his next of kin resided in Emily Township.

References

External links
 Harry Brown digitized service file
 Harry Brown  history of the Tenth Battalion in the First World War include biography of Harry Brown
 Legion Magazine Article on Harry Brown

Canadian World War I recipients of the Victoria Cross
1898 births
1917 deaths
Canadian military personnel killed in World War I
Canadian Expeditionary Force soldiers
People from Frontenac County
Canadian Army soldiers
Calgary Highlanders
Canadian military personnel from Ontario